Missing is an American mystery thriller drama television series, starring Ashley Judd, Cliff Curtis and Sean Bean. The series ran from March 15, 2012 to May 17, 2012 on ABC. ABC announced on May 17, 2011, that the series would air as a midseason replacement in 2012. Ten episodes were ordered for the first season. ABC canceled the series on May 11, 2012. The show was nominated for two Emmy Awards in 2012 – one for Outstanding Lead Actress in a Miniseries or a Movie (Judd) and the other for Outstanding Music Composition for a Miniseries, Movie or a Special.

Plot
The series follows Rebecca "Becca" Winstone (Ashley Judd), a widow and retired CIA agent with an 18-year-old son, Michael (Nick Eversman). In 2001, when Becca and her husband Paul Winstone (Sean Bean) are active CIA agents, he is killed in a car bombing witnessed by their son. In the pilot episode, Michael informs his mother that he has been accepted to a summer architecture program in Rome, Italy. Becca, who now lives an ordinary life running a florist shop, is hesitant to let him go but gives in. After not hearing from him for over a week and receiving a call from the architecture school informing her that Michael has moved out of his dorm room, Becca travels to Rome to track him down, but she finds herself in the middle of an international conspiracy involving the CIA and her husband who is discovered to be alive. Becca then teams up with an Interpol agent (Adriano Giannini) who was once her lover. They work together to find Michael. Meanwhile, Michael meets a Russian girl, Oksana (Tereza Voříšková), whom he befriends, and they team up to escape.

Cast and characters

Main
 Ashley Judd as Rebecca "Becca" Winstone
 Cliff Curtis as Agent Dax Miller
 Sean Bean as Paul Winstone
 Nick Eversman as Michael Winstone
 Adriano Giannini as Giancarlo Rossi
 Tereza Voříšková as Oksana

Recurring
 Keith Carradine as Martin Newman, Becca's former CIA trainer and mentor; he is also Michael's godfather. He is now a best selling author of espionage novels, one of which contains Rick Castle's endorsement on the cover.
 Aunjanue Ellis as Mary Dresden, Becca's business partner and close friend.
 Laura Donnelly as Violet Heath, a member of Miller's CIA team.
 Gina McKee as Jamie Ortega, CIA director in charge of Dax's station, based in Washington D.C.
 Jason Wong as Fitzpatrick, a member of Miller's CIA team.
 Jessica Boone as Rabia, a CIA computer technician.
 Karel Roden as Viktor Azimoff, a former Russian agent.
 Nikola Navratil as Maxim Azimoff, a professional hit man and Viktor's son.

Episodes

International broadcasts

Other media
On March 22, 2012, the Disney-ABC Television Group announced plans to release the first season of Missing in DVD format on June 12, 2012 to the United States and its territories, Canada, and Bermuda. Entitled Missing—The Complete First Season, the package includes all ten episodes in their entirety and features deleted scenes; bloopers; Production Journal: Istanbul; and Genesis Piece, in which producers Ashley Judd and Gina Matthews discuss making the series with show creator Greg Poirier.

Notes

 The series had an early premiere in India on March 11, 2012 on STAR World.

References

External links

2012 American television series debuts
2012 American television series endings
2010s American drama television series
American Broadcasting Company original programming
English-language television shows
Espionage television series
Television series by ABC Studios
Missing 2012
American spy thriller television series